Deh-e Abdollah (also Romanized as Deh-e ‘Abdollāh; also known as ‘Abdollāh) is a village in Dust Mohammad Rural District, in the Central District of Hirmand County, Sistan and Baluchestan Province, Iran. At the 2006 census, its population was 321, in 51 families.

References 

Populated places in Hirmand County